Audley House may be one of several houses and buildings in England:

 Audley House, London, England
 Audley End House, Saffron Waldon, Essex, England
 A Grade I listed building in Salisbury, England
 A Victorian mansion in Prospect, South Australia